Hilldale is a civil parish in the West Lancashire district of Lancashire, England.  It contains seven listed buildings that are recorded in the National Heritage List for England.  All the listed buildings are designated at Grade II, the lowest of the three grades, which is applied to "buildings of national importance and special interest".  The parish contains the small communities of Hilldale and Andertons Mill, and is almost entirely rural.  Apart from a medieval cross base, the listed buildings are all houses, farmhouses, or farm buildings.


Buildings

References

Citations

Sources

Lists of listed buildings in Lancashire
Buildings and structures in the Borough of West Lancashire